Tashua is a census-designated place (CDP) in the town of Trumbull, Fairfield County, Connecticut, United States. It occupies the northwest corner of Trumbull.

Tashua was first listed as a CDP prior to the 2020 census.

References 

Census-designated places in Fairfield County, Connecticut
Census-designated places in Connecticut